Sabine Appelmans won in the final 6–4, 6–3 against Silke Meier.

Seeds
A champion seed is indicated in bold text while text in italics indicates the round in which that seed was eliminated.

  Sabine Hack (first round)
  Irina Spîrlea (semifinals)
  Sandra Cecchini (second round)
  Barbara Rittner (quarterfinals)
  Sabine Appelmans (champion)
  Sandra Cacic (first round)
  Lea Ghirardi (first round)
  Ai Sugiyama (quarterfinals)

Draw

External links
 1995 Zagreb Open Draw

Croatian Bol Ladies Open
1995 WTA Tour